Wilhelm Rabe (16 May 1876 – 9 December 1958) was a German cyclist. He competed in two events at the 1912 Summer Olympics.

References

External links
 

1876 births
1958 deaths
German male cyclists
Olympic cyclists of Germany
Cyclists at the 1912 Summer Olympics
Sportspeople from Magdeburg
Cyclists from Saxony-Anhalt